Viļaka Castle (Mariensee Castle, Marienhausen) is a castle in Balvi Municipality in the Latgale region of Latvia. The castle is located close to Viļaka town, on an island in the Viļaka Lake. Built by Archbishopric of Riga in 1342 as a wooden castle, rebuilt as a stone castle after 1516. The castle was destroyed in 1702 during the Great Northern War. The outer walls are 1.6m thick, remaining fragments of the walls are up to 2 meters high.

See also
List of castles in Latvia

References 

Castles in Latvia
Castles of the Teutonic Knights
Balvi Municipality
Latgale